The 2014–15 Dutch Basketball League season will be the 55th season of the Dutch Basketball League, the highest professional basketball league in the Netherlands. The defending champion was Donar from Groningen.

The league started the season with nine teams, after Matrixx Magixx didn't enter. In December the number of teams was reduced to eight, after Den Helder Kings went bankrupt.

Top seeded SPM Shoeters won the league, by beating Donar 4–1 in the Finals.

Teams

Before the season Matrixx Magixx announced it was withdrawing from the DBL, because the club could not complete its budget. Consequently, the league started with nine teams instead of ten. In December 2014, Port of Den Helder Kings left as well following its bankruptcy.

Notes
 Den Helder Kings was declared bankrupt and all records of the team were expunged on 15 December 2014.
 Till 1 January 2015, BSW was known as "Maxxcom BSW" for sponsorship reasons.

Transactions

Regular season

Standings

Results

Playoffs

Because the number of teams in the DBL decreased to nine, a new play-off format was chosen. After the seeds 3–6 played a best-of-three series in the quarter-finals, the semi-finals and finals would be played in a best-of-seven format.

Championship team

Awards

Individual statistics

Points

Rebounds

Assists

Notable occurrences
On May 29, 2014, health insurance company Zorg en Zekerheid extended its sponsorship contract with ZZ Leiden for three more years.
On May 13, 2014, it was announced ZZ Leiden and head coach Toon van Helfteren, who won six trophies with the club, would part ways. On May 30, the Belgian Eddy Casteels coach was hired as new head coach.
On June 6, 2014, Matrixx Magixx announced the club was close to bankruptcy after having difficulties in finding a new main sponsor to replace The Magixx.
On July 21, 2014, Magixx announced it would withdraw its participation for this season, after they couldn't reach a high enough budget.
On September 29, 2014, the first game ever of the Dutch Talent League (DTL) was played. This league was the newly formed development league of the DBL, mainly made for players under age 25.
On August 9, 2014, Apollo Amsterdam announced that it would play in the DBL after working a long time to reach the DBL budget standard. This would mean the return of a team from Amsterdam since the departure of ABC in 2010.
On August 16, 2014, GasTerra Flames announced it would be named "Donar" again.
On August 29, 2014, the DBL announced for the season a new play-off system would be used. Six teams would qualify this season, compared to eight last year. In the quarter-finals, the first and second seeds received byes.
On December 2, 2014, Den Helder Kings was declared bankrupt. Consequently, the club was expelled from the DBL.

In European competitions

References

 
Dutch Basketball League seasons
1
Netherlands